My Kitchen Rules NZ (series 4) is a reality television cooking programme which airs on TVNZ 2. It follows last season's truncated format of only one instant restaurant round, however, after the first round,  sudden elimination public challenges follows before one-on-one cookoffs semifinals off-sote rather than inside elimination houses. The series is sponsored by Harvey Norman.

The season premiered on 7 October.

Teams

Competition Details

Instant Restaurants

References

2018 New Zealand television seasons
My Kitchen Rules